The Night Owl is a 1926 American silent action film directed by Harry Joe Brown and starring Reed Howes, Gladys Hulette and Joseph W. Girard.

Synopsis
Frustrated that his son spends all his time in nightclubs, his wealthy father arranges for a gang to kidnap him to teach him a lesson. However the gang turn the tables on him and kidnap him for real. With the assistance of a cigarette girl tied up with his abductors, he struggles to free himself.

Cast
 Reed Howes as Larry Armitage
 Gladys Hulette as 	Mary Jackson
 Harold Austin as 	Jimmy Jackson
 Joseph W. Girard as 	William Armittage
 David Kirby as Harlem Red
 Jim Mason as	Gentleman Joe

References

Bibliography
 Connelly, Robert B. The Silents: Silent Feature Films, 1910-36, Volume 40, Issue 2. December Press, 1998.

External links
 

1920s American films
1926 films
1920s action films
1920s English-language films
American silent feature films
American action films
American black-and-white films
Films directed by Harry Joe Brown
Rayart Pictures films
Silent action films